The X Factor Greece is a Greek television reality music competition, based on the original series in the UK, to find new singing talent. The winner of which receives a recording contract with Sony Music Greece is Haris Antoniou. The third series began airing on ANT1 on 1 October 2010 and ended on 11 February 2011.  The show was presented by Sakis Rouvas, with Giorgos Lianos and Maria Sinatsaki hosting the audition shows. The competition is split into several stages: auditions, bootcamp, judges' houses and live shows. Auditions took place throughout July and September 2010, with George Levendis, Giorgos Theofanous, Katerina Gagaki and Nikos Mouratidis returning as judges. Following bootcamp, successful acts were split into four categories: Boys (male soloists aged 16 to 24), Girls (female soloists aged 16 to 24), Over-25s (soloists aged 25 and over) and Groups. The live shows  started on 29 October 2010. It is also broadcast abroad via ANT1's international stations.

Selection process

Auditions
The first appeal for auditions occurred on June. The Auditions began in Nicosia on 23 July 2010 and concluded in New York City for the first time in the history of the Greek X Factor, on 12 September 2010.

Audition Venues

Bootcamp
The "bootcamp" stage of the competition began on 20 September 2010 at the Goudi Olympic Complex, which is now the site of the ultra-modern Badminton Theater, hosting major theatrical productions and completed on 23 September 2010.  This stage of the competition was aired on 22 October 2010.  In this stage, the judges decided at each category the top 20 acts and finally the top 8 acts who qualified to the Judges' Houses.  Katerina Gagaki will mentor Girls Under 24, George Levendis has the Boys Under 24, Nikos Mouratidis was given the 25s and Over and Giorgos Theofanous the Groups category.

Judges Houses
In the next round the judges reduced their 8 acts to locations around Greece. Nikos Mouratidis decided the 4 acts that will follow him to the live shows in Athens, Katerina Gagaki in Santorini, George Levendis in Ithaca and Giorgos Theofanous in Athens.This stage of the competition aired on 27 October 2010. After the judges, narrowed down the contestants to four each.

The sixteen eliminated acts were:

 Under 24 Boys – Giorgos Livanis, Aristotelis Ziberd, Platonas Tsipidis, Vikedios Kavalieratos
 Under 24 Girls – Eleni Plaxoura, Ifigenia Alkison, Kaliopi Papas, Mpela Mary
 25 and Overs – Rania Tekou, Elpida Vitellas, Amy Rivard, Xristos
 Groups – Jocker, D7, Kapnos, Illusion

Contestants and categories
The top 16 acts were confirmed as follows:

Key:
 – Winner
 – Runner-up
 – Third Place

Results summary
Colour key

Live shows
The live shows began on 29 October 2009, with contestants performing on the Friday night shows and the results being announced later on the same day, and continued through to the finale on 11 February 2011. Like the previous series, the televoters had the chance to vote from the beginning of the show.

Week 1 (29 October 2010)

Theme: Mentor's choice and Sakis Rouvas songs
Celebrity performers: Pauline Kamusewu "Never Said I Was A Angel", "Give Me A Call" / Sakis Rouvas "Parafora"
Group performance: Fysika Mazi - Together Forever, Gettin' Over

Judges' votes to eliminate
 Giorgos Theofanous: Elena Georgiou
 Katerina Gagaki: T.U
 George Levendis: Elena Georgiou
 Nikos Mouratidis: T.U
The result went to deadlock, and Elena Georgiou was eliminated from the competition.

Week 2 (5 November 2010)

Theme: Mentor's choice
Celebrity performers: Ivi Adamou "Το Mistiko Mou Na Vreis (I Can't Help It)"  / 48 Ores "Ignorant With Guns"

Judges' votes to eliminate
 Giorgos Theofanous: Patrick Guibert
 Katerina Gagaki: Tik Tok
 George Levendis: Tik Tok
 Nikos Mouratidis: Tik Tok

Week 3 (12 November 2010)

Theme: Mentor's choice
Celebrity performers: Nikiforos "Iposhesou", "Se Ena Fili Sou" / RENT "Agapi"

Judges' votes to eliminate
 Giorgos Theofanous: Alexis Zafeirakis
 Katerina Gagaki: Alexis Zafeirakis
 George Levendis: The Burning Sticks
 Nikos Mouratidis: Alexis Zafeirakis

Week 4 (19 November 2010)

Theme: Mentor's choice
Celebrity performers: Kokkina Xalia "Emeis", "Se Thelw Apopse"

Judges' votes to eliminate
 Giorgos Theofanous: Kirki Katsarou
 Katerina Gagaki: Revolt
 George Levendis: Kirki Katsarou
 Nikos Mouratidis: Kirki Katsarou

Week 5 (26 November 2010)

Theme: Mentor's choice
Celebrity performers: Stavros Michalakakos "Na Me Katastrepseis Glika", "Vres To Nisi (Find the island)" / Mironas Stratis "I Skotini Mou Plevra", "Prin Mas Dei Kaneis"

Judges' votes to eliminate
 Giorgos Theofanous: N/A
 Katerina Gagaki: Revolt
 George Levendis: Revolt
 Nikos Mouratidis: Revolt

Week 6 (3 December 2010)

Theme: Mentor's choice
Celebrity performers:

Judges' votes to eliminate
 Giorgos Theofanous: Patrick Guibert
 Katerina Gagaki: Patrick Guibert
 George Levendis: Patrick Guibert
 Nikos Mouratidis: Maria Katikardiou

Week 7 (10 December 2010)

Theme: Mentor's choice
Celebrity performers: Mark Angelo ft. Shaya "Far From Everything", "In Your Eyes" / Vegas "Mi Se Noiazei", "Mad About You"

Judges' votes to eliminate
 Giorgos Theofanous: The Burning Sticks
 Katerina Gagaki: T.U
 George Levendis: The Burning Sticks
 Nikos Mouratidis: The Burning Sticks

Week 8 (24 December 2010)

Theme: Mentor's choice
Celebrity performers: Onirama "Epanastatis", "Oneiropagida", "O,ti Den Exeis", "Ftwxos", "Ekei Gia Sena Egw"

Judges' votes to eliminate
 Giorgos Theofanous: Maria Katikaridou
 Katerina Gagaki: Dimitris Theodorakoglou
 George Levendis: Maria Katikaridou
 Nikos Mouratidis: Dimitris Theodorakoglou
The result went to deadlock, and Maria Katikaridou and was eliminated from the competition.

Week 9 (31 December 2010)

Theme: Mentor's choice
Celebrity performers: BO featuring Kristina S "Kane Me Na Trelathw" / Matyas "Missing You" / Antonis Remos "Terma I Istoria", "Kommena Pia Ta Daneika", "Einai Stigmes"
Group performance: "The Time (Dirty Bit)", "Written in the Stars", "I Like It", "Firework", "Rotisa", "Ta Isia Anapoda", "Parafora"

Judges' votes to eliminate
 Giorgos Theofanous: Elena Anagiotou
 Katerina Gagaki: Elena Anagiotou
 George Levendis: Elena Anagiotou
 Nikos Mouratidis: T.U

Week 10 (7 January 2011)

Themes: Mentor's choice and Contestant's choice
Celebrity performers: Pale Faces "Ola Petane" / Goin' Through featuring Professional Sinnerz and Nevma "Den Katalabainw", "To Psema Plhrwnei", "Mporw Kai Egw"

Judges' votes to eliminate
 Giorgos Theofanous: Dimitris Theodorakoglou
 Katerina Gagaki: Kostantinos Anastasiadis
 George Levendis: Kostantinos Anastasiadis
 Nikos Mouratidis: Kostantinos Anastasiadis

Week 11 (14 January 2011)

Themes: Songs from Films or Musicals and Contestant's choice
Celebrity performers:  Nikos Ganos "Last Summer", "Koita Ti Ekanes" "Poso Akoma" / Tamta "O'ti Eixa Oneireytei", "Egoista", "Fotia"
Group performance: "Welcome to Burlesque", "But I Am a Good Girl", "Express", "Something's Got a Hold on Me" (from the film Burlesque)

Judges' votes to eliminate
 Giorgos Theofanous: Grigoris Georgiou
 Katerina Gagaki: Grigoris Georgiou
 George Levendis: Grigoris Georgiou
 Nikos Mouratidis: T.U

Week 12 (21 January 2011)

Themes: Best of 90s and Contestant's choice
Celebrity performers: Eleni Alexandri "Dance With You" / Nini Shermadini "S'agapao Akoma (Mi Sei Venuto A Cercare Tu)" / Mellises "Kryfa", "O kinezos", "Epikindina Filia", "Lonely Heart"
Group performance: "Ice Ice Baby", "What Is Love", "All That She Wants", "Something Got Me Started", "U Can't Touch This", "Tubthumping"

Judges' votes to eliminate
 Giorgos Theofanous: Dimitris Theodorakoglou
 Katerina Gagaki: Dimitris Theodorakoglou
 George Levendis: T.U
 Nikos Mouratidis: Dimitris Theodorakoglou

Week 13 (28 January 2011)

Themes: Mentor's choice and Contestant's choice
Celebrity performers: Amaryllis "Ayto Einai O Erwtas" / C:Real ft. Katerina Papoutsaki "To Allo Mou Miso" / OtherView "Kane Me", "Hit the Road Jack(Dirty Mix)"
Group performance: "Fsss Bpoing Touist", "O Mathitis", "To Feggari Panwthe Mou", "Crazy Girl", "H Agapi Thelei Dyo", "Menoume Panta Paidia"

Judges' votes to eliminate
 Giorgos Theofanous: Haris Antoniou
 Katerina Gagaki: T.U
 George Levendis: T.U
 Nikos Mouratidis: T.U

Week 14 (4 February 2011)

Themes: Mentor's choice and Contestant's choice
Group performance: "Ipirhes Panda", "Synora", "S'agapw"
Celebrity performers: Sakis Rouvas "Nekros Okeanos", "I Dio Mas", "Gia Mas"

Week 15 (11 February 2011)

Themes: Mentor's choice and Contestant's choice
Group performances: "Gia na s'ekdikitho", "Simera - Tonight"
Celebrity performers: Elena Paparizou "An Isouna Agapi", "Baby It's Over", "Girna Me Sto Htes", "Psahno Tin Alitheia"

References 

Greece 03